Westringia acifolia is a flowering plant in the family Lamiaceae and is endemic to Western Australia. It is a compact shrub with linear to needle-shaped leaves and white to cream flowers.

Description
Flowering occurs in December.

Taxonomy and naming
Westringia acifolia was first formally described in 2009 by Greg Guerin and the description was published in Australian Systematic Botany.The specific epithet (acifolia) means "sharp leaved".

Distribution and habitat
This species grows in heath on brown clay and sand in the Avon Wheatbelt IBRA bioregion of south-west Australia.

References

 
acifolia
Lamiales of Australia
Eudicots of Western Australia
Plants described in 2009